National Highway 103 (NH 103) connects Hamirpur and Ghaghas in Himachal Pradesh.

Route 
Bhota, Ghumarwin, Dadhol, Dangaar

References

External links
 NH 103 on OpenStreetMap
  NH network map of India

National highways in India
National Highways in Himachal Pradesh
Hamirpur, Himachal Pradesh